Parc du Petit Prince is a theme park in Ungersheim, France.

References

External links

The Little Prince
Amusement parks in France
Tourist attractions in Haut-Rhin
Buildings and structures in Haut-Rhin
Amusement parks opened in 2014
21st-century architecture in France